Peter Gilchrist (born 1968) is a Singaporean billiards player. He won the World Billiards Championship (English billiards) in 1994, 2001, and 2013 (long format), and 2019.

Career
Gilchrist played in Teesside Boys Billiards League as a youth. he was the English Amateur Champion in 1988.

Gilchrist won the World Billiards Championship (English billiards) in 1994, 2001, 2013 (long format) and 2019. He had won International Billiards and Snooker Federation world titles in 2015 (short format), 2016 and 2019 (long up).

In 2003, Gilchrist moved to Singapore to become the national billiards and snooker coach.

Gilchrist represented Singapore in the SEA Games in 2009, where he won Gold for English Billiards Singles, and Bronze for the doubles.

Gilchrist set the world record for highest break in billiards (1346) under modern rules, at the New Zealand Open Billiards Championships. On 14 February 2014, he scored his second 1000 break, at the World Billiards Irish Open. Gilchrist is the only player of the modern era who scored more than one 1000 points in tournament break. 

Gilchrist won the 2019 Pacific International Billiards Championship, beating Sourav Kothari 1500–706 in the final.

In 2022, during the 2021 Southeast Asian Games, Gilchrist won the silver medal after losing 3–1 to Myanmar's Pauk Sa, ending a streak of six gold medals in the English billiards men's singles event.

Gilchrist is a two-time Sportsman of the Year in Singapore, having been named to the awards in the 2020 and 2014 editions of the Singapore Sports Awards.

Personal life 
In 2006, Gilchrist became a Singaporean citizen under the Foreign Sports Talent Scheme. He renounced his British citizenship at the same time.

References 

1968 births
English emigrants to Singapore
Singaporean snooker players
Living people
Asian Games medalists in cue sports
Cue sports players at the 2010 Asian Games
Cue sports players at the 2006 Asian Games
Asian Games bronze medalists for Singapore
Medalists at the 2006 Asian Games
Medalists at the 2010 Asian Games
Southeast Asian Games gold medalists for Singapore
Southeast Asian Games silver medalists for Singapore
Southeast Asian Games bronze medalists for Singapore
Southeast Asian Games medalists in cue sports
Naturalised citizens of Singapore
Competitors at the 2009 Southeast Asian Games
Competitors at the 2011 Southeast Asian Games
Competitors at the 2013 Southeast Asian Games
Competitors at the 2015 Southeast Asian Games
Competitors at the 2017 Southeast Asian Games
Competitors at the 2019 Southeast Asian Games
Competitors at the 2021 Southeast Asian Games